The 1996 Italian Open was a tennis tournament played on outdoor clay courts. It was the 53rd edition of the Rome Masters and was part of the Mercedes Super 9 of the 1996 ATP Tour and of Tier I of the 1996 WTA Tour. Both the men's and women's events took place at the Foro Italico in Rome in Italy. The women's tournament was played from May 6 through May 12, 1996, while the men's tournament was played from May 13 through May 19, 1996.

The men's tournament was headlined by ATP No. 2, Monte Carlo, Estoril, Acapulco and Barcelona champion Thomas Muster, Zagreb, Dubai, Milan, Rotterdam titlist and Key Biscayne runner-up Goran Ivanišević and Adelaide winner, St. Petersburg and Rotterdam finalist Yevgeny Kafelnikov. Also present were Chennai winner Thomas Enqvist, Philadelphia champion Jim Courier, Wayne Ferreira, Marcelo Ríos and Sergi Bruguera.

The women's field was led by WTA No. 1, Indian Wells, Key Biscayne, Berlin champion and WTA Tour Championships defending champion Steffi Graf, Indian Wells, Hamburg runner-up and Australian Open quarterfinalist Conchita Martínez and Hilton Head winner and Wimbledon runner-up Arantxa Sánchez Vicario. Also competing were Tokyo winner Iva Majoli, Magdalena Maleeva, Martina Hingis, Irina Spîrlea and Nathalie Tauziat.

Finals

Men's singles

 Thomas Muster defeated  Richard Krajicek 6–2, 6–4, 3–6, 6–3
 It was Muster's 5th title of the year and the 41st of his career. It was his 2nd Masters title of the year and his 7th overall. It was his 3rd title at the event, having also won in 1990 and 1995.

Women's singles

 Conchita Martínez defeated  Martina Hingis 6–2, 6–3
 It was Martínez's 1st title of the year and the 31st of her career. It was her 1st Tier I title of the year and her 6th overall. It was her 4th title at the event, having also won in 1993, 1994 and 1995.

Men's doubles

 Byron Black /  Grant Connell defeated  Libor Pimek /  Byron Talbot 6–2, 6–3
 It was Black's 3rd title of the year and the 15th of his career. It was Connell's 2nd title of the year and the 19th of his career.

Women's doubles

 Arantxa Sánchez Vicario /  Irina Spîrlea defeated  Gigi Fernández /  Martina Hingis 6–4, 3–6, 6–3
 It was Sánchez Vicario's 8th title of the year and the 70th of her career. It was Spîrlea's 2nd title of the year and the 6th of her career.

References

External links
 Official website  
 Official website 
 ATP Tournament Profile
 WTA Tournament Profile

 
Italian Open
Italian Open
Italian Open
Italian Open (tennis)